Pōrangahau, a township close to the Pacific Ocean coast in the south-east of the North Island of New Zealand, has a very small population.  It lies in the southernmost part of Hawke's Bay, 45 kilometres south of Waipukurau, and close to the mouth of the Porangahau River. The settlement includes a marae and a school.

The Māori name Pōrangahau expresses the idea of a night (pō) of pursuit or of retreat (rangahau).

Six kilometres southwest of the township stands an insubstantial hill, with the longest place name in the world: .

The area west of the main township, known as Mangaorapa, was used for sheep farming during the 20th century. The area has more recently been used for cattle farming and wine growing. The 2370 hectare Mangaorapa Station was the most expensive farm in Central Hawke's Bay when it was sold in 2005.

Demographics
Pōrangahau is part of the larger Taurekaitai statistical area.

Pōrangahau had a population of 141 at the 2018 New Zealand census, an increase of 39 people (38.2%) since the 2013 census, and an increase of 21 people (17.5%) since the 2006 census. There were 51 households, comprising 72 males and 69 females, giving a sex ratio of 1.04 males per female. The median age was 48.8 years (compared with 37.4 years nationally), with 33 people (23.4%) aged under 15 years, 18 (12.8%) aged 15 to 29, 63 (44.7%) aged 30 to 64, and 30 (21.3%) aged 65 or older.

Ethnicities were 42.6% European/Pākehā, 70.2% Māori, 12.8% Pacific peoples, and 2.1% other ethnicities. People may identify with more than one ethnicity.

Although some people chose not to answer the census's question about religious affiliation, 36.2% had no religion, 46.8% were Christian, and 4.3% had Māori religious beliefs.

Of those at least 15 years old, 6 (5.6%) people had a bachelor's or higher degree, and 36 (33.3%) people had no formal qualifications. The median income was $20,600, compared with $31,800 nationally. 3 people (2.8%) earned over $70,000 compared to 17.2% nationally. The employment status of those at least 15 was that 36 (33.3%) people were employed full-time, 18 (16.7%) were part-time, and 6 (5.6%) were unemployed.

Taurekaitai statistical area

Taurekaitai had a population of 1,893 at the 2018 New Zealand census, an increase of 231 people (13.9%) since the 2013 census, and an increase of 135 people (7.7%) since the 2006 census. There were 714 households, comprising 966 males and 927 females, giving a sex ratio of 1.04 males per female. The median age was 44.6 years (compared with 37.4 years nationally), with 417 people (22.0%) aged under 15 years, 225 (11.9%) aged 15 to 29, 900 (47.5%) aged 30 to 64, and 354 (18.7%) aged 65 or older.

Ethnicities were 86.4% European/Pākehā, 19.5% Māori, 2.5% Pacific peoples, 0.3% Asian, and 1.1% other ethnicities. People may identify with more than one ethnicity.

The percentage of people born overseas was 9.2, compared with 27.1% nationally.

Although some people chose not to answer the census's question about religious affiliation, 50.4% had no religion, 40.6% were Christian, 0.8% had Māori religious beliefs, 0.3% were Buddhist and 1.0% had other religions.

Of those at least 15 years old, 261 (17.7%) people had a bachelor's or higher degree, and 285 (19.3%) people had no formal qualifications. The median income was $31,900, compared with $31,800 nationally. 207 people (14.0%) earned over $70,000 compared to 17.2% nationally. The employment status of those at least 15 was that 753 (51.0%) people were employed full-time, 279 (18.9%) were part-time, and 42 (2.8%) were unemployed.

Marae
The local Rongomaraeroa Marae and its meeting house, Te Poho o Kahungunu, are affiliated with the Ngāti Kahungunu hapū of Ngāti Hinetewai, Ngāti Kere, Ngāti Manuhiri, Ngāti Pihere and Tamatea Hinepare o Kahungunu.

Education
Porangahau School is a Year 1–8 co-educational state primary school.

Mangaorapa School merged with Porangahau School at the end of 2014. Mangaorapa School opened in 1925.

Notable people
Max Christie, politician and local farmer
George Hunter, politician and local landowner
Piri Sciascia, Māori leader and kapa haka exponent

References

Central Hawke's Bay District
Populated places in the Hawke's Bay Region